St. Peter's Episcopal Church is a historic Episcopal church located at 400 W. Wall Street in Harrisonville, Cass County, Missouri. It was built in 1895, and is a one-story, cruciform plan, Tudor Gothic Revival style church.  It is constructed of yellow-beige, quarry faced limestone.  It features stick work and pseudo half timbering; a square, shingled cupola; lancet windows; and a crenellated parapet.

It was listed on the National Register of Historic Places in 1982.

References

Episcopal church buildings in Missouri
Churches on the National Register of Historic Places in Missouri
Gothic Revival church buildings in Missouri
Churches completed in 1895
Buildings and structures in Cass County, Missouri
19th-century Episcopal church buildings
National Register of Historic Places in Cass County, Missouri